Francisco Lima da Silva (born 11 February 1984), commonly known as Doka Madureira or Doka, is a Brazilian football midfielder, who plays for Atlético Acreano.

Career

Early years
Born in Sena Madureira, Acre, Doka spent the first five years of his career in with local Rio Branco, later moving to Bahia and Goiás. He was invited by Serbian FK Partizan for a trial period which began in June 2007, but nothing came of it and he subsequently returning to Rio Branco.

Litex Lovech
In November 2008 he was invited by Bulgarian Litex Lovech to join a trial period. He made his team debut a few days later in a 4–1 friendly win against Chavdar Etropole. In December 2008, Litex signed Madureira to a three-year deal. He was given the number 15 shirt.

Madureira marked his Litex Lovech competitive debut with a goal in a 5–1 win away to Nesebar in the Bulgarian Cup on 4 March 2009. Until the end of the season, he earned 17 appearances and scored eight goals. Litex won the Bulgarian Cup on 26 May 2009, to grant Doka his first career cup in Bulgaria. In the final he scored and assisted for a 3–0 win against Pirin Blagoevgrad.

Doka scored his first goal of the 2009–10 season against Lokomotiv Plovdiv on 21 November 2009, scoring the fourth goal of a 5–0 home win. On 14 March 2010, he scored Litex's first goal in their 3–0 victory over Levski Sofia and was awarded Man of the Match. Litex won the A PFG on 2 May 2010 with a win at away to Lokomotiv Plovdiv. Doka scored the second goal for a 3–0 win.

Following the 2010–11 season, he earned 22 appearances in the A PFG, scored 12 goals and provided five assists. On 16 May 2011, Doka was named the ABF A PFG Player of the Season, by the professional footballers association of Bulgaria.

İstanbul Başakşehir

In late June 2011, Doka Madureira was signed by Turkish Süper Lig club Istanbul B.B. The Brazilian's contract is for 3 years, with the option for a 1-year extension. On 11 September 2011, he made his official debut as a starter in the 2:0 home win against Galatasaray in a Süper Lig match. On 24 September 2011, Doka Madureira scored his first goal for the team, converting a penalty in the 2:0 away win against Manisaspor. On 12 May 2012, Madureira received a red card in the 0:4 home loss against Bursaspor.

Ankaragücü
On 31 August 2017 Doka signed with Ankaragücü.

On 26 December 2017, Ank terminated Doka's contract for indiscipline and lack of physical commitment.

Atlético Acreano
On 24 April 2019, Atlético Acreano announced that Madureira had joined their club.

Career statistics

Honours

Club
Litex Lovech
 Bulgarian A PFG (2): 2009–10, 2010–11
 Bulgarian Cup (1): 2009
 Bulgarian Supercup (1): 2010

Individual
 ABF A PFG Player of the Year (1): 2010–11

References

External links

1984 births
Living people
Brazilian footballers
Rio Branco Esporte Clube players
Esporte Clube Bahia players
Goiás Esporte Clube players
PFC Litex Lovech players
İstanbul Başakşehir F.K. players
MKE Ankaragücü footballers
Rio Branco Football Club players
First Professional Football League (Bulgaria) players
Süper Lig players
Brazilian expatriate footballers
Expatriate footballers in Bulgaria
Expatriate footballers in Turkey
Association football midfielders
TFF First League players
Brazilian expatriate sportspeople in Turkey
Sportspeople from Acre (state)